= Templo Expiatorio Nacional de San Felipe de Jesús =

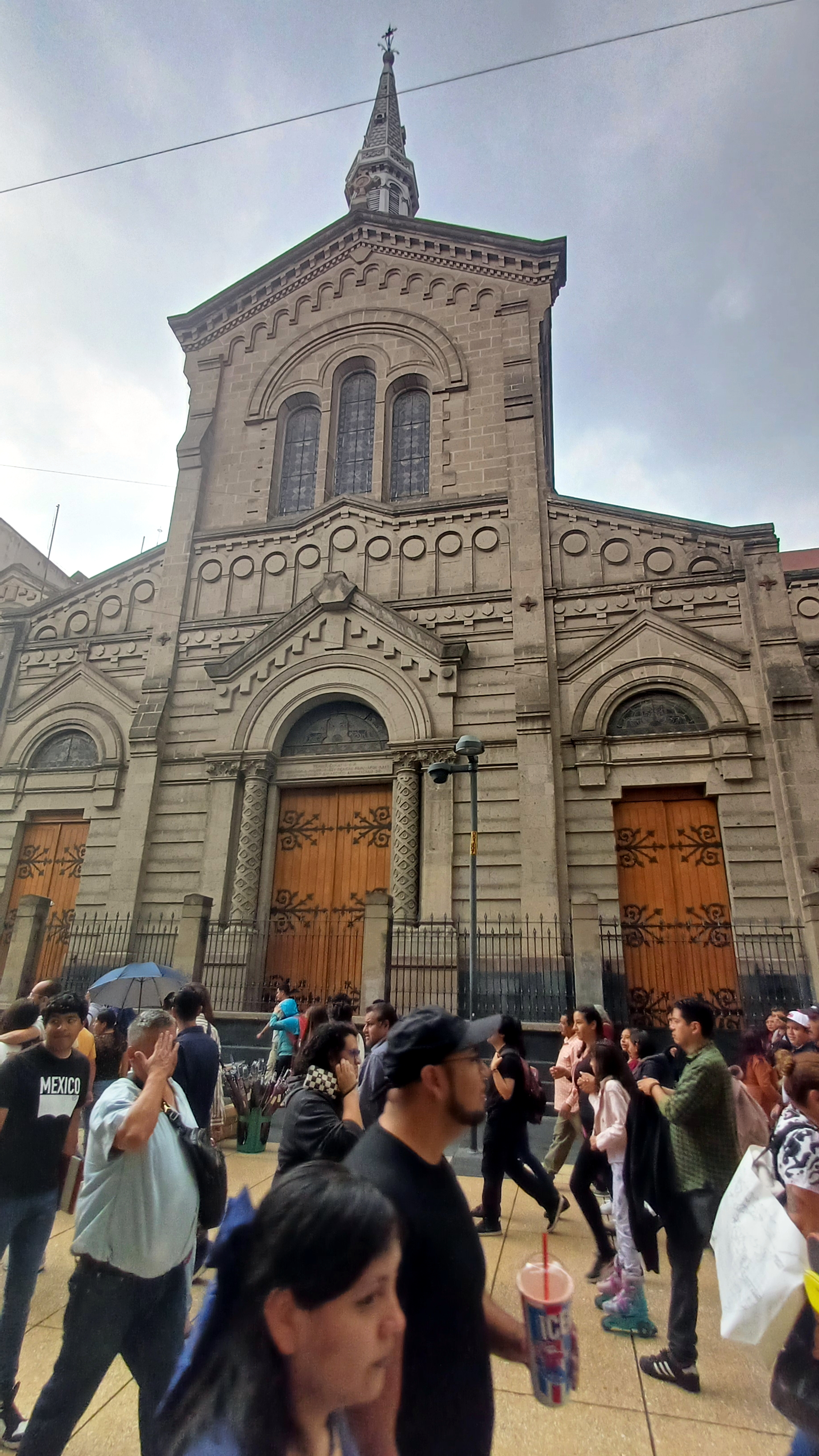
- The church's exterior, 2024
- Templo Expiatorio Nacional de San Felipe de Jesús
- 19°26′1.5″N 99°8′23.5″W
- Location: Mexico City
- Country: Mexico

Templo Expiatorio Nacional de San Felipe de Jesús is an historic church in Mexico City, Mexico.
